The 1911 Richmond Spiders football team was an American football team that represented Richmond College—now known as the University of Richmond—as a member of the Eastern Virginia Intercollegiate Athletic Association (EVIAA) during the 1911 college football season. Led by Sam Honaker in his first and only year as head coach, compiled an overall record of 0–6–2 with a mark of 0–3 in conference play, placing last out of four teams in the EVIAA.

Schedule

References

Richmond
Richmond Spiders football seasons
College football winless seasons
Richmond Spiders football